Two people named Lockier Clere Burges have been prominent in Western Australia.  For the Lockier Clere Burges born in 1814, see Lockier Burges (Australian politician)

Lockier Clere Burges (1841 – 6 January 1929), also known as L. C. Burges junior was prominent and controversial in Western Australia as an entrepreneur, explorer and author.

Burges, the son of John Major Burges and Dorcas Bradshaw, was born at Fethard, County Tipperary, Ireland, in 1841.

During the early 1860s, Burges emigrated to Western Australia, where three of his uncles lived, including L. C. Burges senior (c. 1814–1886) and William Burges (c. 1807–1876). In 1868, L.C. Burges junior married Ann Eliza Finnerty at Fremantle.

From late 1864, he worked for the Roebuck Bay Company (RBC) at the first, albeit short-lived station in the Kimberley, at Cape Villaret.  In 1865, Burges took part in the La Grange expedition, which recovered the bodies of the explorers Frederick Panter, James Harding and William Goldwyer and explored the area between Cape Villaret and Lagrange Bay. The expedition was responsible for the reprisal killing of up to 20 members of the Karajarri people.

After the collapse of the RBC, Burges established Andover, a sheep station on the upper Harding River, in the Pilbara. Burges also invested in pearling vessels based in Nickol Bay. At the time, stations in North-West Australia were staffed almost entirely by local Aboriginal people who were paid in kind with "rations" (food and other goods) rather than money.

In 1871, while droving sheep from the Pilbara to Geraldton, Burges shot and killed an Aboriginal man known as "Mackle-yell", in a dispute over a stolen saddle.  He was convicted of manslaughter in 1872, and sentenced to five years imprisonment. The sentence was commuted to 12 months. Governor Frederick Weld dismissed Perth Police Magistrate E.W.Landor for failing to charge Burges with the capital charge of murder, convicting him of the lesser charge instead. The dismissal was appealed to London

Footnotes

References

 Lockier Clere Burges, c. 1919, Pioneers of Nor'-West Australia, pastoral and pearling, Perth WA, People's Printing & Publishing Co.

1841 births
1886 deaths
19th-century Irish people
Irish emigrants to colonial Australia
Settlers of Western Australia
People associated with massacres of Indigenous Australians
People from County Tipperary
Australian people convicted of manslaughter